Quaking Aspen Falls (also called Tioga Pass Falls) is a 25-foot, multi-stranded waterfall off Tioga Pass Road in Yosemite National Park. Although the falls typically dry up by August, the stream flows year-round both above and below the falls.

Sources

Segmented waterfalls
Waterfalls of Yosemite National Park
Waterfalls of Mariposa County, California